Sugar quartz is a gemstone with a natural surface texture much like fine sugar crystals formed by natural phenomena of microcrystalline facets.

Sugar quartz has a history going back 10,000 years, as referenced in Paleo-Indian.

Sugar quartz was referenced three different times in the United States Geological Survey by Joseph Hyde Pratt in "The Occurrence and Distribution of Corundum in the United States – by Joseph Hyde Pratt", published in 1901 on page 650."A few of the smaller caverns only, near the surface, could be seen. These were lined with crumbling, rust-colored, oxidized ore, beneath which there was often unaltered galena. Sometimes these caves are lined and partly filled with a light, porous, pumiceous sponge of quartz. This is not the cellular, honeycombed quartz resulting from the removal of ore by oxidizing waters, but is an original spongy crystallization of minute quartz crystals, with some interstitial kaolin. It forms a light friable mass that is strongly suggestive of pumice. It is analogous to the "sugar quartz" occurring in vugs, with sericite, in some of the gold- quartz veins of California, although not to the "sugar quartz" which results from a crushing of the vein." Sugar quartz has not been seen or found much since the early 1900s. Any findings in present day are considered extremely rare.

It was referenced seven times in The Mining Investor: Volumes 48-49- January 1, 1907 Critic Publishing Company- Publisher
on page 794 stating "The ores discovered are invariably free milling, occurring in sugar quartz, sometimes heavily 0‘ E: stained with iron. as is the case with the Grot- 

The most recent known legal publication referencing sugar quartz, a total of 13 times, is Mining and Treatment of Feldspar and Kaolin in the Southern Appalachian Region – Arthur Simeon Watts, published First edition, 7“ June, 1913., including in the Table of Contents referring to sugar quartz being on page 163.

Page 58 of the same book refers to sugar quartz is "The sugar quartz is therefore the only pure silica present in commercial quantity in the region investigated. When pure its refractory value is cone 34 (1,810° C.). With the small amount of impurity present its deformation point or refractory value is about cone 32 or 33, that is, 1,780° C."

Several other Native American arrowheads made out of sugar quartz have been found as referenced in  www.ArrowHeadOlogy.com, Lithicasting Lab and Where to Find Arrow Heads.

References

Refractory materials
Quartz gemstones